Mangelia erymna is a species of sea snail, a marine gastropod mollusk in the family Mangeliidae.

Description
The length of the shell attains 4 mm, its diameter 2 mm.

(Original description) This is a curious, thickened, very minute, somewhat corrugate shell, of a pale pink colour. The shell contains 5 whorls. The two apical whorls are rather flat. The third apical whorl is globular and closely cancellate. The two lower whorls are coarsely ribbed and spirally lirate. The body whorl contains 10 ribs and 11 lirae. The lowest lira on the body whorl is very strongly ridged, while below this to the base the shell is fairly smooth. The outer lip is very thickened. The sinus is hardly expressed,. The columellar margin is oblique and simple. The narrow aperture is oblong. The siphonal canal is very short.

Distribution
This marine species occurs off Western India.

References

External links
  Tucker, J.K. 2004 Catalog of recent and fossil turrids (Mollusca: Gastropoda). Zootaxa 682:1–1295.

erymna
Gastropods described in 1917